Mile Hill may refer to:
Mile Hill, Dykehead, Angus, Scotland
Mile Hill (marilyn), Angus, Scotland

See also 
Miles Hill, Leeds, West Yorkshire, England 
Mill Hill - various locations